The Fujifilm X-Pro3 is a mirrorless interchangeable-lens digital camera announced on October 23, 2019. It is part of Fujifilm's X-Series of cameras, the successor to the X-Pro2. Sales began on November 28, 2019.

X-Pro3 is the latest release of the series.

Features
The overall design follows traditional range finder cameras much like the X-Pro 1 and X-Pro 2 before it but like those cameras it is a traditional mirrorless camera but with the addition of an Optical View Finder to compliment the Electric View Finder.

A lever on the front of the camera switches between EVF and OVF with the OVF providing clear framelines and the view outside of these framelines leading to the X-Pro series being popular with street photographers to see what might be entering their shot.

The camera's top and base plates are made from titanium, and the rest of the body shell is made from magnesium alloy. A variant with a harder wearing DuraTect finish for the titanium top and base plates is scheduled to be available from 8 December 2019. Reviewers have indicated the latter finish accentuates fingerprints.

Another notable design change from previous X-Pro models is the X-Pro3's hidden display.  The camera's main LCD screen is mounted on an inward facing hinge and must be opened downwards for viewing or waist level shooting, leaving the screen hidden and the rear of the camera protected when not in use.  On the back side of the LCD screen (viewable when the LCD is not) is a secondary unlit display which can be used to display the camera's settings or the film simulation in use. 

The X-Pro3 does not have in-body image stabilization. The autofocus works down to -6 EV (near darkness).

References

External links
Fujifilm X-Pro3 site

X-Pro3
Cameras introduced in 2019